Cerreto Abbey is a former Cistercian monastery in the town of Abbadia Cerreto, in the province of Lodi, region of Lombardy, Italy. The town is named after the abbey. The building now functions as a parish church.

History 
The original monastery, with surrounding territory, was founded by the Benedictines, but in 1139, the monks at the institution identified themselves as Cistercians. By 1500, the monastery had been reduced to a few members, and the abbey church was converted into a parish church. In 1700, the monks abandoned the abbey to local priests. In 1801, the Napoleonic government expropriated all the goods and sold them to the Marchese Giorgio Teodoro Trivulzio.

References 

Cistercian monasteries in Italy
Monasteries in Lombardy
Christian monasteries established in the 11th century
Churches in the province of Lodi